Cumberland Games & Diversions is an electronic publishing company specializing in indie roleplaying games and TrueType fonts.

History
In 1993, S. John Ross wrote a light-hearted role-playing game called Risus: The Anything RPG. Six years later, in 1999, he founded Cumberland Games & Diversions to publish Risus, as well as the HexPaper mapping font. Ross uses it to publish indie role-playing games such as Uresia: Grave of Heaven, assisted by his wife Sandra, and by freelance creators including friend and artist Dan Smith.  

Cumberland offers several commercial titles in multiple lines, including more than a dozen fonts called Sparks which produced simple paper models to be used as gaming miniatures. Other commercial lines include the All-Systems Library of rules-free resource books.

Reception
The website RPG Resource called Cumberland Games & Diversions "a shining example of how the Internet has opened up the games market to those with ideas and talent, but who do not have the resources, time or inclination to go into business in a big way... Here, S. John Ross shares RPGs and other goodies via PDF files, many being free downloads and others for a small charge."

Publications

Roleplaying Games

 Encounter Critical: A Science-Fiction Fantasy Role Play Game 
 Pokéthulhu Adventure Game 
 Risus: The Anything RPG
 Uresia: Grave of Heaven

References

External links
 Cumberland website

Role-playing game publishing companies